Henry Isaac Rowntree (1838–1883) was the founder of Rowntree's, one of the United Kingdom's largest confectionery businesses.

Career
Having served his apprenticeship in his father's shop at The Pavement in York, and following his father's death in 1860, Henry Rowntree went to work for the Tuke family at their shop in Walmgate.

In June 1862 Henry Isaac bought out the chocolate, cocoa-making and chicory departments and ran the business himself employing around a dozen people. He followed Quaker principles and always insisted on the highest quality. In August 1864 he bought a disused foundry at Tanners Moat and built a new factory there. However, he became distracted from his chocolate business by his mission to produce, edit and print the Yorkshire Weekly Press: accordingly his chocolate business suffered and in June 1869 he took on his brother Joseph as a full partner in the business, now renamed H. I. Rowntree & Co. The brothers continued in partnership and the business went from strength to strength until Henry Isaac's untimely death in 1883.

Family

In February 1868 he married Harriet Selina Osborn in Scarborough.

References

Further reading
 Rowntree and the Marketing Revolution 1862 - 1969 by Robert Fitzgerald, Cambridge University Press, 1995

External links
 Henry I. Rowntree at The Rowntree Society 

Rowntree's
1837 births
1883 deaths
Confectioners
English Quakers
Henry Isaac Rowntree
History of chocolate
19th-century British philanthropists
People from York
19th-century English businesspeople